Kalifa Dienta (Arabic: كاليفا دينتا born 1 January 1940), was a Malian filmmaker. He was best known as the director of critically acclaimed feature film A Banna. In addition to directing, he was also a writer and cinematographer.

Personal life
He was born on 1 January 1940 in Macina, Mali and died in June 2021 in Bamako, Mali . He studied cinema in Moscow.

Career
In 1980, he directed the film A Banna which received mostly positive reviews from critics and selected in several international film festivals.

Filmography

References

External links
 

Living people
Malian film directors
Malian women film directors
1940 births
People from Ségou Region
21st-century Malian people